Eva Berglund (born 14 February 1984) is a Swedish  swimmer from Jönköping, representing Jönköpings SS.

She has participated in some international championship in open water long distance events. She became the first Swedish swimmer competing in a European Championship in Open Water on 26 July 2006 in Lake Balaton, Hungary, during the 2006 European Championships in Aquatics. She finished 11th on the 5 km race. She took part in the 2007 World Championships (5 and 10 km) and the 2008 Olympic Games (10 km).

Personal bests

Long course (50 m)

Short course (25 m)

Clubs
Jönköpings SS

References

1984 births
Living people
Swedish female medley swimmers
Swedish female long-distance swimmers
Swimmers at the 2008 Summer Olympics
Olympic swimmers of Sweden
Jönköpings SS swimmers
Swedish female freestyle swimmers
Sportspeople from Jönköping
20th-century Swedish women
21st-century Swedish women